Allan Monteiro Dias (born 19 October 1988) is a Brazilian professional footballer who plays for ABC as an attacking midfielder.

Club career
Born in Rio de Janeiro, Allan Dias graduated in São Paulo FC's youth setup, appearing on the bench in a 2–0 home success against Figueirense on 28 June 2007. However, after failing to make a first-team appearance for Tricolor, he was subsequently loaned to Toledo Colônia Work, Volta Redonda, Ituano, Guaratinguetá and Santo André, respectively.

In April 2011 Allan Dias joined São Caetano. However, after being sparingly used at Azulão, he moved to Red Bull Brasil on loan in February 2013; after scoring seven times in only 16 matches, Allan Dias joined Guaratinguetá.

On 10 January 2014 Allan Dias returned to Red Bull Brasil, this time in a permanent deal. After achieving promotion with the club, he moved to Portuguesa on 24 April.

On 4 November Allan Dias rescinded with Lusa, and returned to RB Brasil eight days later.

References

External links

1988 births
Living people
Footballers from Rio de Janeiro (city)
Brazilian footballers
Association football midfielders
Campeonato Brasileiro Série B players
Campeonato Brasileiro Série C players
Campeonato Brasileiro Série D players
São Paulo FC players
Volta Redonda FC players
Ituano FC players
Guaratinguetá Futebol players
Esporte Clube Santo André players
Associação Desportiva São Caetano players
Red Bull Brasil players
Associação Portuguesa de Desportos players
Guarani FC players
Botafogo Futebol Clube (SP) players
Clube do Remo players
União Recreativa dos Trabalhadores players
Esporte Clube São Bento players